"I Don't Care" is a song by British-based female duo Shakespears Sister, released on 4 May 1992 as the third single from their second studio album, Hormonally Yours (1992). The song reached number seven on the UK Singles Chart and had similar success internationally, reaching the top 20 in Australia, Ireland and New Zealand. It also charted on the US Billboard Hot 100, peaking at number 55. Like several of Shakespears Sister's previous singles, it was heavily remixed for its release as a single, including re-recorded vocals and added instrumentals.

The song incorporates a segment of the poem "Hornpipe" by Dame Edith Sitwell (from her Façade, and Other Poems poetry book), which is a surreal poem that attempts to capture the flow of a sailors jig. The poem is spoken by Siobhan Fahey on the song.

Critical reception
Tom Demalon from AllMusic described the song as "bouncy and resilient". Larry Flick from Billboard wrote that a "lively, guitar-anchored ditty is fueled by finger-poppin' rhythms and shaking tambourines." He added further that the duo's "unconventional vocal style charms, as do light, retro horn fills at the close. An adventurous pop delight with strong multiformat appeal." Randy Clark from Cash Box called it an "upbeat, slightly quirky pop cut, with an almost '60s-ish jangle to it, featuring the dual vocals of the performance artists". The Daily Vault's Michael R. Smith remarked Marcella Detroit's "ear-piercing wail" at the beginning. A reviewer from Lennox Herald concluded, "While this is unlikely to repeat the success of "Stay", it will be a hit no doubt." 

Paul Lester from Melody Maker commented, "So the title reads, "I Don't Care", but the subtext is pure merciless revenge fantasy where the singer does care, deeply so. Siobhan Fahey is incredibly rich, extremely angry and quite, quite mad. There's something comforting about that." Pan-European magazine Music & Media found that a "syncopated beat, moulded after Pretenders' "Don't Get Me Wrong", forms the backing of this remarkable piece of uptempo pop, sporting a catchy chorus." People Magazine also felt that the song "sounds like an effervescent version of the Pretenders." In an retrospective review, Pop Rescue wrote that it "bursts open with Marcella's screaming introduction before wriggling into some wonderful guitar/bass." Troy J. Augusto from Variety described the song as "perky".

Music video
The accompanying music video for the song, directed by British director Sophie Muller, showed Siobhan Fahey and Marcella Detroit's characters plotting to kill one another. The video ends with a climax on a mock stage - Fahey dressed in Victorian garb, in contrast to Detroit's poised and refrained character. During the first two choruses the band is performing the song, first in rehearsal and the second in concert.   
The video mirrored the internal struggle the duo was going through, as their personal relationship was deteriorating and eventually the duo was ended by Fahey in 1993. The video is also notable for its forefront inclusion of the duo's touring members.

Track listings

 UK 7-inch and cassette single, Japanese mini-CD single
 "I Don't Care" (7-inch remix) – 4:25
 "Remember My Name" – 3:35

 UK CD1
 "I Don't Care" (7-inch remix) – 4:25
 "I Don't Care" (Henley Board mix) – 4:06
 "I Don't Care" (LP version) – 4:16
 "Remember My Name" – 3:35

 UK CD2
 "I Don't Care" (radio edit) – 4:06
 "Catwoman" (live on BBC) – 4:21
  "I Don't Care" (live on BBC) – 4:21
 "You're History" (Voodoo mix) – 6:31

 European CD single
 "I Don't Care" (radio edit) – 4:06
 "I Don't Care" (7-inch remix) – 4:25
 "I Don't Care" (Henley Board mix) – 4:06
 "Catwoman" (live on BBC) – 4:21
 "Remember My Name" – 3:35

 US CD and cassette single
 "I Don't Care" (radio edit) – 3:56
 "Stay" (acoustic version) – 3:44

 Australian CD and cassette single
 "I Don't Care" (radio edit) – 4:06
 "Catwoman" (live on BBC) – 4:21
 "You're History" (Voodoo mix) – 6:31

Charts

References

1992 singles
1992 songs
London Records singles
Music videos directed by Sophie Muller
Shakespears Sister songs
Song recordings produced by Alan Moulder
Songs written by David A. Stewart
Songs written by Marcella Detroit
Songs written by Richard Feldman (songwriter)
Songs written by Siobhan Fahey